This is a list of British television related events from 1950.

Events

January
No events.

February
23 February – First televised report of general election results in the UK with coverage of the 1950 United Kingdom general election, although the footage is not recorded. Richard Dimbleby hosts the BBC coverage of the election which he will do again for the 1951, 1955, 1959 and the 1964 United Kingdom general elections. On this occasion, Dimbleby is joined in the BBC Lime Grove Studios by R. B. McCallum, Fellow of Pembroke College, Oxford and author of The British General Election of 1945 and David Butler, research student of Nuffield College. The first election night programme runs from 10:45pm until just after 1am.

March
No events.

April
3 April – The BBC aspect ratio changes from 5:4 to 4:3.

May
21 May – The BBC's Lime Grove television studios open.

June
No events.

July
11 July – Andy Pandy premieres on the BBC Television Service.

August
27 August – The first ever live television pictures from across the English Channel are transmitted by the BBC Television Service. The two-hour programme is broadcast live from Calais in northern France to mark the centenary of the first message sent by submarine telegraph cable from England to France.

September
8 September–27 October — No issues of Radio Times are published, due to a printing dispute.
30 September – First BBC Television Service broadcast from an aircraft.

October
13 October – George Barnes becomes Director of BBC Television, taking over from Norman Collins.

November
No events.

December
20 December – Poet T. S. Eliot expresses concerns about "the television habit" in a letter to The Times (London).
23 December – Gala Variety with Tommy Cooper, becomes the first programme to be broadcast by the BBC from the former Gainsborough Studios in Lime Grove, purchased by the corporation in the previous year.

Unknown
A cable network is launched in Gloucester, to provide better television reception than is possible at this time via a roof-top aerial.

Debuts
8 January – Rope (1950)
2 February – The Scarlet Pimpernel (1950)
5 March – Sunday Night Theatre (1950–1959)
6 June – The Admirable Crichton (1950)
11 July – Andy Pandy (1950–1970, 2002–2005)
30 July – Adventure Story (1950)
24 November – Pet's Parlour with Petula Clark (1950–1953)
12 December – Little Women, drama serial in six parts, starring Norah Gorsen, David Jacobs, Barbara Everest and others (ends 23 January 1951)
31 December – Mr. Pastry's Progress (1950–1951)

Continuing television shows

1920s
BBC Wimbledon (1927–1939, 1946–2019, 2021–2024)

1930s
Picture Page (1936–1939, 1946–1952)
For the Children (1937–1939, 1946–1952)
The Boat Race (1938–1939, 1946–2019)
BBC Cricket (1939, 1946–1999, 2020–2024)

1940s
Kaleidoscope (1946–1953)
Muffin the Mule (1946–1955, 2005–2006)
Café Continental (1947–1953)
Television Newsreel (1948–1954)
Come Dancing (1949–1998)
How Do You View? (1949–1953)

Births
 20 January – Liza Goddard, stage and television actress
 27 January 
Derek Acorah, medium and television host (died 2020)
Alex Norton, actor and screenwriter
 3 February – Pamela Franklin, actress
 22 February – Julie Walters, actress
 22 March – Mary Tamm, actress (died 2012)
 30 March – Robbie Coltrane, Scottish actor and comedian (died 2022)
 3 April – Sally Thomsett, actress
 9 May – Matthew Kelly, English actor and television host
 10 May – Sally James, television presenter and actress
 11 May – Jeremy Paxman, television presenter and author
 9 June – David Troughton, actor
 8 July – Sarah Kennedy, broadcaster
 19 July – Simon Cadell, actor (died 1996)
 26 July – Susan George, actress
 19 August – Jennie Bond, journalist and television presenter
 17 September – Sherrie Hewson, actress, television presenter and novelist
 14 December – Vicki Michelle, actress
 17 December – Michael Cashman, actor and politician

Deaths
4 March — Anthony Holles, actor, aged 49
8 May — Franklin Dyall, actor, aged 80
June — Claude Bailey, actor, aged 54

See also
 1950 in British music
 1950 in the United Kingdom
 List of British films of 1950

References